N Gokulakrishnan is a politician. He was a Member of Parliament, representing Puducherry in the Rajya Sabha (the upper house of India's Parliament).He was elected as the term of P. Kannan of INC end on 6 October 2015.

He belongs to the Indian All India Anna Dravida Munnetra Kazhagam (ADMK) political party.

References

1958 births
 Living people
 All India Anna Dravida Munnetra Kazhagam politicians
 Rajya Sabha members from Puducherry
 Puducherry politicians